The Point Foundation was a nonprofit organization based in San Francisco and founded  by Stewart Brand and Dick Raymond. It published works related to the Whole Earth Catalog. It was also a co-owner of The WELL.

Notes

External links
The future of Point: a growing dialog - the Point Foundation

Environmental organizations based in California
Whole Earth Catalog
Conservation and environmental foundations in the United States